Kódyma is a city in Odesa Oblast (region) of central Ukraine, located in the historic region of Podolia, south-eastern Podilia. Ithosts the administration of  Kodyma urban hromada, one of the hromadas of Ukraine. Population:

Description
Kodyma is named after a river Kodyma, on which it is located. 

On maps of the 16th century of Wenceslaus Grodecki there is a region identified as "Codima solitudo, uastissima" (a very vast desert). The area is located around the mid-stream of Southern Bug. It is believed that the Kodyma's etymology of Turkic origin and means a lower saturated with water place.

In the Polish Geographic dictionary (Słownik geograficzny) it is mentioned as a small town (miasteczko) in Balta county and has a train station on the Kyiv–Odesa railroad. The city foundation date is stated as 1754, however according to the Geographic Dictionary Kodyma as a real estate existed before and belonged to the family of Zamoyski. Later it transferred to the family of Koniecpolski after Johanna Barabara Zamoyska married Aleksander Koniecpolski.

In 1694 Cossacks of Semen Paliy defeated a Tatar army at the battle of Kodyma.

The modern city of Kodyma was founded by Józef Lubomirski (son of Jerzy Aleksander Lubomirski) in 1754.

Notable people 
 Leon Feinberg, Jewish-American Yiddish poet and journalist, was born in Kodyma
Stanisław Skalski, a Polish fighter ace of the Polish Air Force in World War II, was born in Kodyma

Useful information and administration links 
Travel guide and useful information
Information and news site
Kodyma City Council website

References

External links
 

Cities in Odesa Oblast
Cities of district significance in Ukraine
Baltsky Uyezd
Cities in Podilsk Raion